Wellington Lima (born 20 November 1979) is a Brazilian artistic acrobat and performer who currently works as a performer in the Michael Jackson ONE show at Cirque du Soleil.

Early life 

Wellington Lima was born in Recife, Brazil. He started studying acrobatics and capoeira when he was 11 years old. Three years later, he began participating in gymnastics competitions in the Northwest of Brazil and soon discovered his passion for the trampoline and being up in the air. He went on to travel and train throughout Brazil and, after four years, won the Trampoline Nationals in Brazil.
In 1996, Wellington began teaching acrobatics to at-risk youth in a circus school in Recife. Being involved in the program gave him a sense of his roots and a belief in his ability to inspire young people to believe in themselves and to contribute to their success.

In 1997, after winning Nationals, Wellington moved from his hometown of Recife to Rio de Janeiro to continue his training with the national team. The week he arrived in Rio, Wellington was invited to audition for Cirque du Soleil. A few weeks later, he received an offer to be a part of Cirque du Soleil's new creation La Nouba, which was being developed for the Walt Disney World Resort in Orlando, FL. Wellington worked in La Nouba for six years where he played the role of one of the main characters, Pierrot Rouge, in the show. In 2002, he was one of 35 Cirque performers who were chosen by the company to perform at the Oscars®.

From 2004 through 2009, Wellington joined the touring show Dralion and became a part of the Trampowall act in the show. He traveled through Europe, Japan, and Australia with the show. Currently, Wellington is working on his fourth Cirque du Soleil creation Michael Jackson ONE in Las Vegas and continues to teach acrobatics to at-risk youth through Cirque du Monde.

Cirque Du Soleil Career 

1998–2004 – La Nouba in Orlando, FL—Primary Character/Acrobat

2004–2009 – Dralion World Tour—Performer/Acrobat

2009–2012 – Viva Elvis in Las Vegas, NV—Performer

2013–Present – Michael Jackson ONE in Las Vegas, NV—Performer

Stage/ Theatre Career 

25th Trampoline World Championships - Performer/Choreographer - 2007 - Quebec (CAN)

One Drop Foundation benefit show (CDS) - Performer/Choreographer - 2014 - Las Vegas (USA)

XVII Pan American Games(45/CDS) - Main Character - 2015 - Toronto (CAN)

Television/Broadcast

XVII Pan American Games

Redbull Cirque Du Soleil High Performance Exchange

2002 Oscars

Movies

Worlds Away 3D Movie

Sostrum DVD

La Nouba DVD

Special Activities 

Cirque Du Monde Social Outreach Program – General Coach - Worldwide

Capoeira Brazilian Pelorinho da Topázio - Instructor/Organizer - http://vegascapoeira.com/

Personal trainer – NASM

References 

Living people
1979 births
Acrobats
Cirque du Soleil performers